Gérard Philipe (born Gérard Albert Philip, 4 December 1922 – 25 November 1959) was a prominent French actor who appeared in 32 films between 1944 and 1959. Active in both theatre and cinema, he was, until his early death, one of the main stars of the post-war period. His image has remained youthful and romantic, which has made him one of the icons of French cinema.

Life and career

Early life

Born Gérard Albert Philip in Cannes in a well-off family, he was of one-quarter Czech ancestry from his maternal grandmother. His father, Marcel Philip (1893–1973), was a barrister and businessman in Cannes; his mother was Maria Elisa "Minou" Philip, née Vilette (1894–1970). On his mother's advice, in 1944 Gérard changed his surname from "Philip" to "Philipe".

As a teenager, Philipe took acting lessons before going to Paris to study  at the Conservatoire of Dramatic Art.

Early films
Philipe made his film debut in Les Petites du quai aux fleurs (1943), directed by Marc Allégret, in an uncredited role.

He had a minor role in Box of Dreams (1945) then was third billed in Land Without Stars (1946) after Jani Holt and Pierre Brasseur; George Lacombe wrote and directed.

When he was 19 years old, he made his stage debut at a theatre in Nice; and the following year his strong performance in the Albert Camus play Caligula made his reputation.

Stardom
Philipe had a lead role in The Idiot (1946), an adaptation of the novel by Fyodor Dostoevsky, co-starring Edwige Feuillère for director Georges Lampin. This was seen in other countries and established Philipe as a leading man. He was in Ouvert pour cause d'inventaire (1946), a short film that was an early work for Alain Resnais.

He was invited to work with the Théâtre national populaire (T.N.P.) in Paris and Avignon, whose festival, founded in 1947 by Jean Vilar, is France's oldest and most famous.

Philipe gained fame as a result of his performance in Claude Autant-Lara's Devil in the Flesh (1947), alongside Micheline Presle. It was a huge box office success.

He went on to star in La Chartreuse de Parme (1948) for director Christian-Jacque, which was even more popular than Devil in the Flesh. He followed it with Such a Pretty Little Beach (1949) for Yves Allégret; All Roads Lead to Rome (1949), a reunion with Presle, for Jean Boyer; and Beauty and the Devil (1950) for René Clair.

Philipe was one of several stars in Max Ophüls' version of La Ronde (1950). He followed it with another all-star film, Lost Souvenirs (1951) for Christian-Jacques.

In 1951, Philipe married Nicole Fourcade (1917–1990), an actress/writer, with whom he had two children. She adopted the pseudonym, Anne Philipe, and wrote about her husband in two books, the first called  Souvenirs (1960) and a second biography titled Le Temps d'un soupir (No Longer Than a Sigh, 1963).

Philipe was in Juliette, or Key of Dreams (1951) with Suzanne Cloutier for Marcel Carné; The Seven Deadly Sins (1952), an all-star anthology film; and Fan Fan the Tulip (1953), a swashbuckling adventure with Gina Lollobrigida for Christian-Jacque which was very popular.

He was in Beauties of the Night (1952), again with Lollobrigida, and Martine Carol, directed by Clair; The Proud and the Beautiful (1953) with Michèle Morgan; two more all-star anthologies: It Happened in the Park (1953) and Royal Affairs in Versailles (1954).

Philipe tried an English movie, Lovers, Happy Lovers! (1954, also known as Knave of Hearts), directed by René Clément and co-starring Valerie Hobson.

He then did The Red and the Black (1954) with Danielle Darrieux and had a big success with The Grand Maneuver (1955) for René Clair, co-starring Morgan.

Philipe did The Best Part (1956) for Yves Allégret and was one of many stars in If Paris Were Told to Us (1956).

He wrote, directed and starred in Bold Adventure (1956), a comic adventure film.

He starred in Lovers of Paris (1957) for Julien Duvivier and Montparnasse 19 (1958) for Jacques Becker. He was one of many stars in Life Together (1958) and top billed in The Gambler (1958).

In 1958 he went to New York and performed on Broadway in the all-French Lorenzaccio and Le Cid.

Philipe played Valmont in Roger Vadim's modern day version of Les liaisons dangereuses (1959), appearing alongside Jeanne Moreau.

His last film was Fever Mounts at El Pao (1960) for Luis Buñuel.

Death
He died from liver cancer while working on a film project in Paris, a few days short of his 37th birthday. (His doctors concealed from him the nature of his disease.) In accordance with his last wishes, he is buried, dressed in the costume of Don Rodrigue (The Cid), in the village cemetery in Ramatuelle, Var, near the Mediterranean coast.

To commemorate the centenary of the cinema in 1995, the French government issued a series of limited edition coins that included a 100 franc coin bearing the image of Philipe. Among the most popular French actors of modern times, he has been elevated to mythic status in his homeland, not least because of his early death at the peak of his popularity.

Honours

"Rue Gérard Philipe" is a street in the 16th arrondissement of Paris named in his honour.

In 1961, his portrait appeared on a French commemorative postage stamp. 

The "Gérard Philipe Theatre" (TGP) in Paris was named after him.  From 1962 to 2000, the "Grand Prix Gérard Philipe de la Ville de Paris" was awarded almost annually by the city of Paris for the best actress or best actor at a Parisian theatre. Prize winners included Gérard Depardieu, Daniel Auteuil, Maria de Medeiros and Isabelle Carré.

There is also a film festival named in his honour as well as a number of theatres and schools (such as the College Gérard Philipe – Cogolin) in various parts of France. A cultural centre is named after him in Berlin.

Filmography

Acting

Voice
 Le Petit Prince (1954)
 La Vie de W.-A. Mozart – racontée aux enfants (1954)
 Pierre et le Loup (Peter and the Wolf by Sergei Prokofiev) with the Symphony Orchestra of the USSR (1956)

References

Bibliography

External links

 
 
 
 Gérard Philipe at filmsdefrance.com
 Gérard Philipe at Film Reference
 Gérard Philipe A fan-maintained website
 

1922 births
1959 deaths
People from Cannes
Deaths from cancer in France
Deaths from liver cancer
French male film actors
French male stage actors
French people of Romanian descent
French people of Czech descent
20th-century French male actors
César Honorary Award recipients